Brian Gottfried was the defending champion but did not compete that year.

Tim Wilkison won in the final 6–1, 6–1, 6–2 against Pavel Složil.

Seeds

  Vitas Gerulaitis (first round)
  Libor Pimek (first round)
  Henri Leconte (semifinals)
  Heinz Günthardt (quarterfinals)
 n/a
  Balázs Taróczy (first round)
  Jan Gunnarsson (quarterfinals)
  Tim Wilkison (champion)

Draw

Final

Section 1

Section 2

External links
 1984 Fischer-Grand Prix draw

Singles